William Crowe may refer to:

William Crowe (bibliographer) (1616–1675)
William Crowe (Dean of Clonfert) (1657–1726), Irish priest
William Crowe (politician) (fl. 1703), MP for Blessington (Parliament of Ireland constituency)
William Crowe (poet) (1745–1829), English poet
William J. Crowe (1925 – 2007), former Chairman of the U.S. Joint Chiefs of Staff
Wil Crowe (born 1994), baseball pitcher for the Pittsburgh Pirates
William Crowe, the main character of the video game Heroes of the Pacific

See also
William Crow (disambiguation)